"Taste the Pain" is a song by the Red Hot Chili Peppers from the album Mother's Milk, and was the third and final single from that album. The music video was filmed with the band playing in an art room, where artists are in the middle of painting a mural artwork, directed by Tom Stern and Alex Winter.

The song was recorded after Chad Smith joined the band as the drummer, however, on this record, drums are played by Fishbone's Philip "Fish" Fisher and was the first song John Frusciante recorded with the band. When the song is played backwards, the voice heard at the start is Anthony Kiedis clearly singing the chorus. This song also features a trumpet solo by Flea. A slightly longer version of the song was featured on the soundtrack for the film Say Anything... starring Kiedis's girlfriend at the time, Ione Skye.

The single contained two original B-sides. "Show Me Your Soul" was recorded during the Mother's Milk sessions and was also later released as a single in 1990 when it was featured on the soundtrack for the film Pretty Woman. "Millionaires Against Hunger" was recorded during sessions for 1985's Freaky Styley.

The single reached number twenty-nine in the UK—the highest position for the band up to that point.

Live performances 
Despite being a popular single for the band, the song was rarely performed by the band and it hasn't been performed since 1990 during the Mother's Milk tour.

Track listing
7" radio promo single (1989)
 "All for Love" by Nancy Wilson
 "Taste the Pain" by Red Hot Chili Peppers

"Unbridled Funk and Roll 4 Your Soul!" limited edition CD single (1989)

 "Taste the Pain" (album version)
 "Millionaires Against Hunger" 
 "Castles Made of Sand" (live; unreleased)
 "Higher Ground" (Daddy-O Mix)

1990 UK cassette single (1990)
"Taste the Pain"
"Show Me Your Soul"

1990 UK CD single (1990)
"Taste the Pain" (single version)
"Taste the Pain" (LP version)
"Show Me Your Soul" (unreleased)
"Nevermind"

12" pop-out sleeve (1990)
"Taste the Pain" (album version)
"Show Me Your Soul" (unreleased)
"If You Want Me to Stay"
"Nevermind"

7" single (1990)
"Taste the Pain" (album version)
"Show Me Your Soul" (unreleased)

7" limited edition square disc single (1990)
"Taste the Pain" (album version)
"Show Me Your Soul" (unreleased)
"Castles Made of Sand" (live; unreleased)

7" promo single (1990)
"Taste the Pain" (album version)
"Castles Made of Sand" (live; unreleased)
"Special Secret Song Inside" (live; unreleased)
"F.U." (live; unreleased)

Charts

Personnel
Red Hot Chili Peppers
Anthony Kiedis – lead vocals 
John Frusciante – guitar, backing vocals
Flea – bass, trumpet, backing vocals

Additional musicians
Philip "Fish" Fisher – drums 
Dave Coleman – cello

References

Red Hot Chili Peppers songs
1989 singles
Songs written by Flea (musician)
Songs written by John Frusciante
Songs written by Anthony Kiedis
1989 songs
EMI Records singles
Song recordings produced by Michael Beinhorn
Music videos directed by Alex Winter
Music videos directed by Tom Stern